Fighting Pioneers is a 1935 American Western film directed by Harry L. Fraser and written by Harry L. Fraser and Charles E. Roberts. The film stars Rex Bell, Ruth Mix, Buzz Barton, Stanley Blystone, Earl Dwire and Chuck Morrison. The film was released on May 21, 1935, by Resolute Pictures Corp.

Plot

Cast           
Rex Bell as Lieutenant Bentley
Ruth Mix as Wa-No-Na
Buzz Barton as Splinters
Stanley Blystone as Hadley
Earl Dwire as Sergeant Luke
Chuck Morrison	as Sergeant O'Shaughnessy
John Elliott as Major Dent 
Roger Williams as Captain Burton
Chief Thundercloud as Eagle Feathers 
Chief Standing Bear as Chief Black Hawk
Guate Mozin as Crazy Horse

References

External links
 

1935 films
1930s English-language films
American Western (genre) films
1935 Western (genre) films
Films about Native Americans
Films directed by Harry L. Fraser
American black-and-white films
1930s American films